Matthew Carter Courtney (born December 21, 1961) is a former American football defensive back who played for the San Francisco 49ers of the National Football League (NFL) and the Jacksonville Bulls in the United States Football League (USFL). He played college football at Idaho State University.

References

Further reading
  
  
  

Living people
American football defensive backs
Idaho State Bengals football players
1961 births
Players of American football from Colorado
Jacksonville Bulls players
San Francisco 49ers players
National Football League replacement players